Indonesian National Route 20 is a major road in East Java, Indonesia. It passes through 4 regencies in East Java.

Route
The route traverses from north to south: Babat – Bojonegoro – Padangan – Ngawi (town) – Maospati – Madiun – Caruban.

References

20
Transport in Java
Transport in East Java